The Atlantic Division is one of the three divisions in the Eastern Conference of the National Basketball Association (NBA). The division consists of five teams, the Boston Celtics, the Brooklyn Nets, the New York Knicks, the Philadelphia 76ers and the Toronto Raptors. All teams, except the Raptors, are located on the East Coast of the United States. However, Toronto sports teams have over the years enjoyed rivalries with teams in the Northeastern United States (particularly, Toronto teams also share divisions with Boston and New York teams in Major League Baseball and the National Hockey League.

The division was created at the start of the 1970–71 season, when the league expanded from 14 to 17 teams with the addition of the Buffalo Braves, the Cleveland Cavaliers and the Portland Trail Blazers. The league realigned itself into two conferences, the Western Conference and the Eastern Conference, with two divisions in each conference. The Atlantic Division began with four inaugural members, the Celtics, the Braves, the Knicks and the 76ers. The Celtics, the Knicks and the 76ers all joined from the Eastern Division.

The Celtics have won the most Atlantic Division titles with 23. Nine NBA champions have come from the Atlantic Division. The Celtics have won seventeen championships, while the Knicks, the 76ers and the Raptors have won one championship each. All of them, except the 1972–73 Knicks, were division champions. In the 1983–84 season, all five teams from the division qualified for the playoffs. In the 1982–83 season, all teams in the division had winning percentages above 0.500 (50%).

Since the 2021–22 season, the Atlantic Division champions has received the Nat "Sweetwater" Clifton Trophy, named after Hall of Famer Nathaniel Clifton.

Current standings

Teams

Notes
 denotes a team that merged from the American Basketball Association (ABA).

Former teams

Notes
 denotes an expansion team.

Team timeline

Nat "Sweetwater" Clifton Trophy
Beginning with the 2021–22 season, the Atlantic Division champions has received the Nat "Sweetwater" Clifton Trophy. As with the other division championship trophies, it is named after one of the African American pioneers from NBA history. Nathaniel Clifton was one of the first African American players to sign an NBA contract when he joined the New York Knicks in 1950. The Clifton Trophy consists of a  crystal ball.

Division champions

Titles by team

Season results

Rivalries

Boston Celtics vs. New York Knicks

Boston Celtics vs. Philadelphia 76ers

New York Knicks vs. Brooklyn Nets

Toronto Raptors vs. Brooklyn Nets

Notes
 Because of a lockout, the season did not start until February 5, 1999, and all 29 teams played a shortened 50-game regular season schedule.
 Because of a lockout, the season did not start until December 25, 2011, and all 30 teams played a shortened 66-game regular season schedule.
In the aftermath of the Boston Marathon bombing, the NBA canceled the April 16 game scheduled in Boston between the Celtics and the Pacers; the game was not rescheduled because it would have had no impact on either team's playoff seedings.

References
General

Specific

External links
NBA.com Team Index

Eastern Conference (NBA)
National Basketball Association divisions
Boston Celtics
Brooklyn Nets
Buffalo Braves
Charlotte Hornets
Miami Heat
New Jersey Nets
New York Nets
New York Knicks
Orlando Magic
Philadelphia 76ers
Toronto Raptors
Washington Bullets
Washington Wizards
Articles which contain graphical timelines
NBA